The 2021 Tajik Supercup was the 12th Tajik Supercup, an annual Tajik football match played between the winners of the previous season's Tajikistan Higher League and Tajikistan Cup. The match was contested by 2020 League champions Istiklol, and the 2020 Cup champions Ravshan. It was held at the Central Stadium in Hisor on 3 April.

Background

On 1 April, Abdullo Davlatov was confirmed as the match referee.

Match details

See also
2020 Tajikistan Higher League
2020 Tajikistan Cup

References

Super Cup
Tajik Supercup